Kentucky Route 498 (KY 498) is a  state highway in Lee County, Kentucky that runs from Kentucky Route 52 to Kentucky Route 11 north of Beattyville.

Major intersections

References

0498
Transportation in Lee County, Kentucky